The Loup is a river in the Alpes-Maritimes department, Southeastern France. It takes its source in Andon.

Geography

The stream first turns east, then turns south and forms the Gorges du Loup, a series of gorges. After passing Bar-sur-Loup, it resumes its course towards the east, passes south of the city of Vence, then moves towards the south-east and arrives at Villeneuve-Loubet.

From there it flows into the Mediterranean Sea southwest of Cagnes-sur-Mer.

Hydrology

The water flow in the Loup was observed for a period of 34 years (1980-2013) in Villeneuve-Loubet, a commune in the Alpes-Maritimes department, located at its mouth at the Mediterranean Sea.

Cities and villages along the river
The Loup flows through the following cities and villages (source to mouth):
Andon, Gréolières, Cipières, Courmes, Gourdon, Pont-du-Loup, Bar-sur-Loup, La Colle-sur-Loup, Villeneuve-Loubet

Gorges du Loup

The Gorges du Loup is a gorge carved by the Loup river in the Maritime Alps in France, about 45 minutes from Nice.

Waterfalls 
There are several cascades in the gorge. Among them are the Saut du Loup and the Cascade de Courmes.

Climbing 

The gorge is a popular climbing area with several high-level routes, with at least 22 routes above the grade . According to UKClimbing the gorge offers a total of 451 routes set in the French limestone. The first free route in the gorge was Déversé Satanique, opened by Bernard Duterte in the mid 1980s. Now graded .

9a difficulty routes 
 Kick Ass - August 2012 - Enzo Oddo
 Trip Tik Tonik - July 2011 - Gérome Pouvreau
 PuntX - 12 August 2007 - Alexandre Chabot
 Abysse - 28 July 2006 - Alexandre Chabot
 Kinematix - 6 October 2001 - Andreas Bindhammer

References

Rivers of France
Rivers of Alpes-Maritimes
Rivers of Provence-Alpes-Côte d'Azur
0Loup
Climbing areas of France